The 1991–92 NBA season was the 22nd season for the Portland Trail Blazers in the National Basketball Association. In the off-season, the Blazers signed undrafted rookie guard Robert Pack. After losing three of their first four games, the team would quickly recover as they held a 32–14 record at the All-Star break. The Blazers finished their season with a 57–25 record, earning their second straight Pacific Division championship and 10th consecutive trip to the NBA Playoffs.

Clyde Drexler averaged 25.0 points, 6.6 rebounds, 6.7 assists and 1.8 steals per game, and was named to the All-NBA First Team, selected for the 1992 NBA All-Star Game, and finished a distant second to Michael Jordan in the MVP ballot. In addition, Terry Porter averaged 18.1 points, 5.8 assists and 1.5 steals per game, while Jerome Kersey provided the team with 12.6 points, 8.2 rebounds and 1.5 steals per game, and Buck Williams contributed 11.3 points and 8.8 rebounds per game, and was named to the NBA All-Defensive Second Team. Sixth man Clifford Robinson averaged 12.4 points and 5.1 rebounds per game off the bench, while Kevin Duckworth provided with 10.7 points and 6.1 rebounds per game, and Danny Ainge contributed 9.7 points per game off the bench.

The Blazers began their postseason run by defeating the Los Angeles Lakers 3–1 in the Western Conference First Round, eliminating the Lakers for the first time since Portland's championship season of 1977; the Lakers had beaten the Blazers in four playoff series since then, including most recently the 1991 Western Conference Finals. The Blazers proceeded to defeat the Phoenix Suns, 4–1 in the Western Conference Semi-finals, and Karl Malone and John Stockton's Utah Jazz 4–2 in the Western Conference Finals, earning their second trip to the NBA Finals in three years, and a matchup with the defending champion Chicago Bulls. The Blazers' dream of winning their second NBA title, however, was stifled by the Michael Jordan and Scottie Pippen-led Bulls, who defeated the Blazers 4–2 and won their second straight NBA title. Following the season, Ainge signed as a free agent with the Phoenix Suns, and Pack was traded to the Denver Nuggets.

For the season, the Blazers changed their primary logo, which showed the team name next to red and black lines curling into each other, and redesigned their uniforms. The logo and uniforms both remained in use until 2002.

As of 2022, this season was the last time the Trail Blazers had reached the NBA Finals.

Draft picks

Roster

Regular season

Season standings

y – clinched division title
x – clinched playoff spot

z – clinched division title
y – clinched division title
x – clinched playoff spot

Record vs. opponents

Game log

Playoffs

| home_wins = 2
| home_losses = 0
| road_wins = 1
| road_losses = 1
}}
|- align="center" bgcolor="#ccffcc"
| 1
| April 23
| L.A. Lakers
| W 115–102
| Clifford Robinson (24)
| Buck Williams (13)
| Clyde Drexler (10)
| Memorial Coliseum12,888
| 1–0
|- align="center" bgcolor="#ccffcc"
| 2
| April 25
| L.A. Lakers
| W 101–79
| Kevin Duckworth (19)
| Buck Williams (12)
| Terry Porter (6)
| Memorial Coliseum12,888
| 2–0
|- align="center" bgcolor="#ffcccc"
| 3
| April 29
| @ L.A. Lakers
| L 119–121 (OT)
| Clyde Drexler (42)
| Buck Williams (13)
| Clyde Drexler (12)
| Great Western Forum16,690
| 2–1
|- align="center" bgcolor="#ccffcc"
| 4
| May 3
| @ L.A. Lakers
| W 102–76
| Clyde Drexler (26)
| Buck Williams (11)
| Clyde Drexler (7)
| Thomas & Mack Center15,478
| 3–1
|-

| home_wins = 3
| home_losses = 0
| road_wins = 1
| road_losses = 1
}}
|- align="center" bgcolor="#ccffcc"
| 1
| May 5
| Phoenix
| W 113–111
| Terry Porter (31)
| Clyde Drexler (10)
| Terry Porter (7)
| Memorial Coliseum12,888
| 1–0
|- align="center" bgcolor="#ccffcc"
| 2
| May 7
| Phoenix
| W 126–119
| Porter, Drexler (27)
| Jerome Kersey (9)
| Clyde Drexler (13)
| Memorial Coliseum12,888
| 2–0
|- align="center" bgcolor="#ffcccc"
| 3
| May 9
| @ Phoenix
| L 117–124
| Clyde Drexler (37)
| Jerome Kersey (9)
| Terry Porter (11)
| Arizona Veterans Memorial Coliseum14,496
| 2–1
|- align="center" bgcolor="#ccffcc"
| 4
| May 11
| @ Phoenix
| W 153–151 (2OT)
| Clyde Drexler (33)
| Jerome Kersey (10)
| Terry Porter (14)
| Arizona Veterans Memorial Coliseum14,496
| 3–1
|- align="center" bgcolor="#ccffcc"
| 5
| May 14
| Phoenix
| W 118–106
| Clyde Drexler (34)
| Kersey, Williams (12)
| Drexler, Kersey (8)
| Memorial Coliseum12,888
| 4–1
|-

| home_wins = 3
| home_losses = 0
| road_wins = 1
| road_losses = 2
}}
|- align="center" bgcolor="#ccffcc"
| 1
| May 16
| Utah
| W 113–88
| Terry Porter (26)
| Buck Williams (8)
| Drexler, Porter (8)
| Memorial Coliseum12,888
| 1–0
|- align="center" bgcolor="#ccffcc"
| 2
| May 19
| Utah
| W 119–102
| Terry Porter (41)
| Duckworth, Robinson (7)
| Clyde Drexler (12)
| Memorial Coliseum12,888
| 2–0
|- align="center" bgcolor="#ffcccc"
| 3
| May 22
| @ Utah
| L 89–97
| Drexler, Kersey (26)
| Kersey, Williams (9)
| Drexler, Porter (7)
| Delta Center19,911
| 2–1
|- align="center" bgcolor="#ffcccc"
| 4
| May 24
| @ Utah
| L 112–121
| Terry Porter (34)
| Jerome Kersey (8)
| Terry Porter (7)
| Delta Center19,911
| 2–2
|- align="center" bgcolor="#ccffcc"
| 5
| May 26
| Utah
| W 127–121 (OT)
| Jerome Kersey (29)
| Buck Williams (12)
| Terry Porter (12)
| Memorial Coliseum12,888
| 3–2
|- align="center" bgcolor="#ccffcc"
| 6
| May 28
| @ Utah
| W 105–97
| three players tied (18)
| Buck Williams (8)
| Terry Porter (10)
| Delta Center19,911
| 4–2
|-

| home_wins = 1
| home_losses = 2
| road_wins = 1
| road_losses = 2
}}
|- align="center" bgcolor="#ffcccc"
| 1
| June 3
| @ Chicago
| L 89–122
| Drexler, Robinson (16)
| Jerome Kersey (7)
| Clyde Drexler (7)
| Chicago Stadium18,676
| 0–1
|- align="center" bgcolor="#ccffcc"
| 2
| June 5
| @ Chicago
| W 115–104 (OT)
| Clyde Drexler (26)
| Buck Williams (14)
| Clyde Drexler (8)
| Chicago Stadium18,676
| 1–1
|- align="center" bgcolor="#ffcccc"
| 3
| June 7
| Chicago
| L 84–94
| Clyde Drexler (32)
| Jerome Kersey (12)
| Terry Porter (4)
| Memorial Coliseum12,888
| 1–2
|- align="center" bgcolor="#ccffcc"
| 4
| June 10
| Chicago
| W 93–88
| Drexler, Kersey (21)
| Kevin Duckworth (11)
| Clyde Drexler (9)
| Memorial Coliseum12,888
| 2–2
|- align="center" bgcolor="#ffcccc"
| 5
| June 12
| Chicago
| L 106–119
| Clyde Drexler (30)
| Jerome Kersey (12)
| Terry Porter (8)
| Memorial Coliseum12,888
| 2–3
|- align="center" bgcolor="#ffcccc"
| 6
| June 14
| @ Chicago
| L 93–97
| Drexler, Kersey (24)
| Jerome Kersey (9)
| Terry Porter (8)
| Chicago Stadium18,678
| 2–4
|-

Player statistics

NOTE: Please write the players statistics in alphabetical order by last name.

Season

Playoffs

Awards and records
 Clyde Drexler, All-NBA First Team
 Buck Williams, NBA All-Defensive Second Team

Transactions

References

Portland Trail Blazers seasons
Western Conference (NBA) championship seasons
Portland Trail Blazers 1991
Portland Trail Blazers 1992
Port
Port
Port